Kyungpook National University Hospital station is a station of Daegu Metro Line 2 in Samdeok-dong, Daebong-dong, Jung District, Daegu, South Korea.

External links 
  Cyber station information from Daegu Metropolitan Transit Corporation

See also 
 Kyungpook National University Hospital
 Chilgok Kyungpook National University Medical Center station

Daegu Metro stations
Jung District, Daegu
Railway stations opened in 2005